Lucy Packer (born 2 February 2000) is an Anglo-Welsh rugby union player. She is a member of the England women's national rugby union team and plays for Harlequins at club level, but has previously represented Wales in rugby sevens.

International career
Packer made her debut for England off the bench against the USA in November 2021.

In September 2022 Packer was named in the England squad for the COVID-delayed 2021 Rugby World Cup.

Club career 
Packer signed with Harlequins in 2018 and was part of their title-winning 2020-21 squad.

Early life and education 
Packer grew up in Ammanford, where she attended Ysgol Dyffryn Aman, She played for Amman utd and Cardiff Quins. She is currently studying biochemistry at the University of Surrey. She is distantly related to rugby legend Adrian Stoop.

References 

Living people
England women's international rugby union players
English female rugby union players
2000 births
Rugby union players from Ammanford